Life of Contradiction is the first album of reggae musician Joe Higgs. It was recorded in 1972 and released in 1975.
The BBC describes the album as "a highly conceptual, deeply personal record by one of reggae’s true masters that deserves to cross over into popular music’s wider canon". The album was recorded with the Now Generation band. The album was re-released in 2008.

Track listing
 Come On Home
 Got To Make A Way
 Wake Up And Live
 Life Of Contradiction
 Who Brought Down The Curtains
 There's A Reward
 Hard Times Don't Bother Me
 My Baby Still Love Me
 She Was The One
 Song My Enemy Sings
 Let Us Do Something *
 Freedom Journey *

Bonus tracks on the Pressure Sounds reissue only.

References

External links
Billboard review

1975 albums
Joe Higgs albums